Adabank A.Ş. was founded in 1984 and was seizured from the Uzan Grubu as from the İmarbank Scandal. 99.9% of the company was transferred to the TMSF, the Turkish Savings Deposit Insurance Fund. Adabank A.Ş. was sold in 2006 to the Kuwaiti, The International Investor Company. The BDDK, the Turkish Banking Regulation and Supervision Agency cancelled the deal, as it found the acquiring party not being able to rais the necessary capital. In 2008, another bid was made, and Kök Menkul ve Gayrımenkul Yatırım Ticaret A.Ş., part of the Sinpaş Grubu successfully bid for the Bank. As of now, no other declarations and news have been received regarding future operations.

On 26 November 2010. Turkey's Savings Deposit Insurance Fund, or SDIF, has turned down BankPozitif’s offer to buy Adabank at an auction. Savings Deposit Insurance Fund expected $90 million as sale price and BankPozitif offer of $46 million was rejected as too low. Bank Pozitif, majority-owned by Israel's Bank Hapoalim, was the sole bidder for the small Turkish lender Adabank. Bank Hapoalim, Israel's second-largest bank, bought a 57.6 percent stake in Turkey's Bank Pozitif in 2006 and raised its stake to 65 percent in 2008.

See also

List of banks
List of banks in Turkey

References

Banks established in 1984
Banks of Turkey
Companies listed on the Istanbul Stock Exchange
Companies based in Istanbul
Turkish companies established in 1984